Fuzzy routing is the application of fuzzy logic to routing protocols, particularly in the context of ad-hoc wireless networks and in networks supporting multiple quality of service classes. It is currently the subject of research.

See also 
 Dynamic routing
 List of ad hoc routing protocols

External links 
 Hui Liu et al., An Adaptive Genetic Fuzzy Multi-path Routing Protocol for Wireless Ad Hoc Networks
 Runtong Zhang, A Fuzzy Routing Mechanism In Next-Generation Networks

Routing protocols
Fuzzy logic
Wireless networking